Bouquet is the thirteenth studio album by composer and guitarist Robbie Basho, released independently in 1983 by Basho Productions.

Track listing

Personnel
Adapted from the Bouquet liner notes.
 Robbie Basho – acoustic guitar, vocals, acoustic twelve-string guitar (B2), piano (B6)
 Consortium of the Arts Choir – vocals (B2)

Release history

References

1983 albums
Robbie Basho albums